The lechwe, red lechwe, or southern lechwe (Kobus leche) is an antelope found in wetlands of south-central Africa.

Range
The lechwe is native to Botswana, Zambia, southeastern Democratic Republic of the Congo, northeastern Namibia, and eastern Angola, especially in the Okavango Delta, Kafue Flats, and Bangweulu Wetlands. The species is fairly common in zoos and wild animal farms.

Description
They are golden brown with white bellies. Males are darker in colour, but exact hue and amount of blackish on the front legs, chest and body varies depending on subspecies. The long, spiral horns are vaguely lyre-shaped and borne only by males. The hind legs are somewhat longer in proportion than in other antelopes to ease long-distance running on marshy soil.

Habitats
Lechwe are found in marshy areas where they are an important herbivore of aquatic plants. They use the knee-deep water as protection from predators. Their legs are covered in a water-repellant substance which allows them to run quite fast in knee-deep water. Lechwe are diurnal. They gather in herds which can include many thousands of individuals. Herds are usually all of one sex, but during mating season they mix.

Taxonomy

Subspecies

Four subspecies of the lechwe have been recognized.

 Common red lechwe (Kobus leche leche) (Gray, 1850) - Widely distributed in the wetlands of Zimbabwe, Botswana, Namibia and Zambia.
 Kafue Flats lechwe (Kobus leche kafuensis) (Haltenorth, 1963) - It is confined within the Kafue Flats (seasonally inundated flood-plain on the Kafue River, Zambia).
  Roberts' lechwe (Kobus leche robertsi) (Rothschild, 1907) - Formerly found in northeastern Zambia, now extinct. Also called the Kawambwa lechwe.
 Black lechwe (Kobus leche smithemani) (Lydekker, 1900) - Found in the Bangweulu region of Zambia.

In addition, the Upemba lechwe (Kobus anselli) and the extinct Cape lechwe (Kobus venterae) are also considered subspecies by some authorities (as Kobus leche anselli and Kobus leche venterae).

Although related and sharing the name "lechwe", the Nile lechwe (K. megaceros) is consistently recognized as a separate species.

Reproduction
Lechwe mate during rain seasons of November to February. They have a gestation period of seven to eight months so a majority of calves are born from July to September.  Although rare, hybrids between lechwe and waterbuck have been observed.

References

External links

ARKive - images and movies of the black lechwe (Kobus leche smithemani)

Marsh antelopes
Mammals of Sub-Saharan Africa
Mammals of Central Africa
Mammals of Angola
Mammals of the Democratic Republic of the Congo
Mammals of Namibia
Mammals of Zambia
Mammals described in 1850
Taxa named by John Edward Gray